Torre Sant'Andrea di Missipezza Lighthouse is an active lighthouse in the frazione of Torre Sant'Andrea in the municipality of Melendugno.

Description
The light house consists of a lantern placed atop a massive masonry old defence tower with the seaward side painted with white and black checkerboard pattern, the other three sides are painted in white.

See also
List of lighthouses in Italy

References

External links

 Servizio Fari Marina Militare

Lighthouses in Italy